Debtor Nation: The History of America in Red Ink is a book written by Harvard economic historian Louis Hyman and published by Princeton University Press in 2011.

Argument
The book argues that in order to understand the rise of our contemporary debt-driven economy, we must look back at the history of American markets and American policy in the 20th century.

The book combines the methods of economic, business, political, and social history.

Chapters
The book is arranged into nine chapters, spanning the twentieth century.
 An Introduction to the History of Debt
 Chapter One: Making Credit Modern: The Origins of the Debt Infrastructure in the 1920s
 Chapter Two: Debt and Recovery: New Deal Housing Policy and the Making of National Mortgage Markets
 Chapter Three: How Commercial Bankers Discovered Consumer Credit: The Federal Housing Administration and Personal Loan Departments, 1934–1938
 Chapter Four: War and Credit: Government Regulation and Changing Credit Practices
 Chapter Five: Postwar Consumer Credit: Borrowing for Prosperity
 Chapter Six: Legitimating the Credit Infrastructure: Race, Gender, and Credit Access
 Chapter Seven: Securing Debt in an Insecure World: Credit Cards and Capital Markets
 Epilogue: Debt as Choice, Debt as Structure

In popular culture
Hyman's arguments in Debtor Nation inform his explanations of the financial crisis in David Sington's documentary The Flaw which premiered at the Sheffield International Documentary Festival in November 2010.

See also
 Debt: The First 5000 Years a 2011 book by David Graeber

References

External links
 Debtor Nation, author's site for the book
 Debtor Nation, the publisher's site for the book
 "Chapter One: Making Credit Modern: The Origins of the Debt Infrastructure in the 1920s"

2011 non-fiction books
History books about the United States
Princeton University Press books